The Kvalsund ship (Norwegian: Kvalsundskipet), also known as Kvalsund II, is a late 8th century rowing ship, discovered embedded in a marsh at Kvalsund in Herøy, Møre og Romsdal near Ålesund, Norway, in 1920.

The Kvalsund ship is of an earlier and less advanced construction than the Oseberg ship, also found in Norway, which dates to the early ninth century. Being from around the start of the Viking Age and likely part of an offering in a pond or bog, the Kvalsund ship represents an important link between later Viking Age ships and earlier, pre-Viking Age vessels (like the Nydam boat) and rituals. Both the ship and the smaller rowboat that was found with it were deliberately destroyed before being placed in the pond or bog, and no human remains have been found (i.e., the offering does not appear to have been part of a burial). This resembles earlier, pre-Viking Age finds from Denmark, but is unlike typical Viking Age ship burials. The ship featured a detachable rudder on one side that could be removed in shallow water, and its shape suggests it might have had a sail. If so, it would have been of a very simple type, as it lacks some features typical of sailing ships; thus it appears to have been transitional between earlier, pre-Viking Age rowing ships and the later typical Viking ships, sharing some features with both. A mast was found at the smaller Kvalsund I boat, but it is unclear if it belongs to it. The earliest Scandinavian ship confirmed to have had a sail was the Oseberg ship.

References

 New Viking Ship, The New York Times, August 22, 1920, pg. X10.
Kvalsund ship at the Sunnmøre Museum, Aalesund

Archaeological sites in Norway
Medieval ships
Ships preserved in museums
8th century in Norway